Nanjiang may refer to:

Chinese county
 Nanjiang County (南江县), a county in Sichuan province.

Chinese town
 Nanjiang, Pingjiang (南江镇), a town in Pingjiang County, Hunan province.

Chinese region
 Nanjiang (南疆), a term for south part of Xinjiang Uyghur Autonomous Region of China. See Altishahr.